Kimaama, or Kimaghama, is a language spoken on Yos Sudarso Island in Papua province, Indonesia.

Grammar
Kimaghama has isolating morphology.

References 

Languages of Papua New Guinea
Kolopom languages